Michael Bryce Giles (born 27 December 1959) is a British mathematician and computer scientist. He is a Professor of Scientific Computing and Head of Department at the Mathematical Institute, University of Oxford and a Fellow of St Hugh’s College, Oxford. He is best known for developing Multilevel Monte Carlo methods.

Education 
Giles studied mathematics as an undergraduate at the University of Cambridge, graduating in 1981 as senior wrangler. He then moved to MIT as a Kennedy Scholar, where he received his PhD in aeronautics in 1985.

Career and research 
After obtaining his PhD, Giles became a professor in MIT’s Department of Aeronautics and Astronautics. In 1992, he joined the University of Oxford’s Department of Computer Science, before moving to the Mathematical Institute in 2008. He became Head of Department of the Mathematical Institute in 2018.

In the earlier part of his career, Giles worked on computational fluid dynamics applied to the analysis and design of gas turbines. More recently, he has focused on computational finance and the development of Multilevel Monte Carlo methods.

References 

1959 births
Living people
Massachusetts Institute of Technology alumni
Massachusetts Institute of Technology faculty
20th-century British mathematicians
21st-century British mathematicians
Academics of the University of Oxford
Alumni of the University of Cambridge
British computer scientists